KAJF-LD (channel 21) is a low-power television station serving Kansas City, Missouri, United States. Its nominal city of license is Topeka, Kansas, but its signal does not reach that area. Owned by HC2 Holdings, it is a sister station to KCMN-LD (channel 42, also licensed to Topeka). KAJF-LD's signal originates from a transmitter on the southeast side of Kansas City, Missouri, just off 58th Street near the Exit 65 interchange of Interstate 435.

Digital channels 
The station's signal is multiplexed:

References

External links

DTV America.com

Innovate Corp.
Low-power television stations in the United States
Television stations in Kansas
2016 establishments in Kansas
Television channels and stations established in 2016
LX (TV network) affiliates